Arif Kocaman (born 14 September 2003) is a Turkish professional footballer who plays as a centre-back for the Turkish club Kayserispor.

Professional career
Kocaman is a youth product of Tavşanlı Linyitspor and Sakaryaspor. He signed his first professional contract with Sakaryaspor in May 2021, and made an appearance with them in the TFF Second League. He transferred to the Süper Lig club Kayserispor in January 2022, signing a 4-year contract. He made his professional debut with Kayserispor as a late substitute in a 3–0 Süper Lig win over Yeni Malatyaspor on 14 May 2022.

International career
Kocaman was first called up to the Turkey U21s for a set of matches in September 2022.

References

External links
 
 

2003 births
Living people
People from Tavşanlı
Turkish footballers
Turkey under-21 international footballers
Sakaryaspor footballers
Kayserispor footballers
Süper Lig players
TFF Second League players
Association football defenders